Heshimu Kenyata Evans (born May 8, 1975) is an American-born Portuguese former basketball player, who last played for S.L. Benfica of the Portuguese Basketball League (LPB).

Evans, a small forward from Evander Childs High School in The Bronx, went to Trinity-Pawling School as a postgraduate (Pawling, New York) before attending Manhattan College, where he was named Metro Atlantic Athletic Conference (MAAC) rookie of the year in 1995.  He followed that up with a first team All-MAAC performance as a sophomore in 1996.

Following his sophomore year, Evans transferred to the University of Kentucky.  After sitting out the 1996–97 season as a transfer, he was a key player off the bench for the Wildcats' 1998 NCAA championship team.  He averaged 8.8 points and 5.4 rebounds per game.  His senior year, he moved into the starting lineup, averaging 11.8 points and 5.4 rebounds per game.

Evans was not selected in the 1999 NBA draft.  He signed with ÉS Chalon-sur-Saône in France, kicking off a successful international career.  After a stop in Japan, Evans made his way to Portugal in 2001, where he would later become a naturalized citizen.  In 2009, Evans joined Benfica, where he led the team to the LPB championship in 2010.  Evans led the team with 23 points in the series-clinching game.

Titles

Benfica
 Liga Portuguesa de Basquetebol: 3
2009–10, 2011–12, 2012–13
 Taça da Liga / Hugo dos Santos: 2
2010–11, 2012–13
 Supertaça: 2
 2009–10, 2012–13
António Pratas Trophy: 1
2011–12
Supertaça Portugal-Angola: 1
2009–10

References

External links 
Career stats at Proballers.com

1975 births
Living people
American expatriate basketball people in Angola
American expatriate basketball people in France
American expatriate basketball people in Japan
American expatriate basketball people in Portugal
American expatriate basketball people in Spain
American men's basketball players
Atlético Petróleos de Luanda basketball players
Baloncesto León players
Basket Zaragoza players
Basketball players from New York (state)
Élan Chalon players
FC Porto basketball players
Kentucky Wildcats men's basketball players
Liga ACB players
Manhattan Jaspers basketball players
Nagoya Diamond Dolphins players
Naturalised citizens of Portugal
Portuguese men's basketball players
S.L. Benfica basketball players
Small forwards
Portuguese people of American descent